Wie Pech & Schwefel is the fourth album released by Schandmaul on 26 April 2004. It remained in the German Longplay Charts for six weeks, peaking at #13.

Track listing

Personnel
 Thomas Lindner – vocals, acoustic guitar, accordion
 Birgit Muggenthaler-Schmack – flutes, shawms, bagpipe, vocals
 Martin "Ducky" Duckstein – electric guitar, acoustic guitar, classical guitar, vocals
 Stefan Brunner – drums, percussion, vocals
 Matthias Richter – bass, upright bass 
 Anna Kränzlein – violin, hurdy-gurdy, vocal 
 Dominik Büll – cello on 4, 6
 Oliver s. Tyr (Faun) – celtic harp on 7
 Claas Triebel – choir arrangement on 12

References

2004 albums
Schandmaul albums